Major Benjamin Coxson, also known as The Maj, ( – June 8, 1973) was an American drug kingpin from Philadelphia, Pennsylvania. He was a flamboyant entrepreneur, civil rights activist, inner city power broker and intermediary between Italian-American and African-American organized crime groups. He co-owned a Philadelphia nightclub with civil-rights activist Stanley Branche, was close friends and neighbor to Muhammad Ali and ran unsuccessfully for mayor of Camden, New Jersey in 1972.

Coxson was murdered in his home in Cherry Hill, New Jersey on June 8, 1973. The police theorized that the Philadelphia Black Mafia killed him for his failure to broker a heroin deal with the New York Mafia.

Early life and education
Coxson was born to Israel and Maybell Coxson in Fairbank, Pennsylvania. He attended Benjamin Franklin High School in Philadelphia, Pennsylvania. As a teenager, he worked at shoeshine stands and car washes. He invested the money in used car lots, car dealerships and other enterprises. He was drafted in 1946 during the 1940 to 1947 World War II drafting.

Career
Coxson co-owned a nightclub in Center City Philadelphia with civil rights activist Stanley Branche named the Rolls Royce Lounge.  Coxson operated as a drug kingpin while running the nightclub.

He was arrested 17 times and convicted 10 on fraud and larceny charges. He served 22 months in a federal prison in Lewisburg, Pennsylvania for his involvement in an interstate car theft ring. He was an associate of Angelo Bruno, the mafia boss of the Philadelphia crime family. Coxson was the Black Mafia's narcotic connection, he received high grade heroin from the notorious East Coast drug trafficker Frank Matthews.

He was involved in the establishment of dummy corporations for money laundering, credit card fraud and extortion. Companies such as Crescent Furniture Company, Pyramid Enterprises, Barry Goldstein Agency and Fairmount Foods drew checks that were made payable to Elijah Muhammad's Mosque No. 12 in Philadelphia.

He was a close friend and neighbor of Muhammad Ali when he lived in Cherry Hill, New Jersey. They met in 1968 when Ali spoke at a fundraiser for a neighborhood organization called the Black Coalition of which Coxson was a board member.

In 1970, after Muhammad Ali defeated Jerry Quarry in the ring, he grabbed the microphone from Howard Cosell and declared: "I dedicate this win to Major Coxson, the future mayor of Camden, New Jersey."

In 1972, Coxson ran for mayor of Camden, New Jersey, but lost to Angelo Errichetti.  When questioned during the campaign about his criminal record, Coxson replied:

Murder
Coxson was murdered on June 8, 1973, in his home at 1146A Barbara Drive in Cherry Hill, New Jersey. Coxson along with his companion, her daughter, and her oldest son, were bound and shot. Her younger son, was also bound but was able to escape and alert a neighbor. One of the victims told police that four black men in a Cadillac arrived at the house at 4:00 AM. He stated that they honked the car horn and were let in the house by Coxson; therefore, he assumed they were friends. The five men spoke for a while before the violence began.

It was theorized that the Black Mafia ordered Coxson killed for failing to broker a major heroin deal between the New York Mafia and the Philadelphia Black Mafia.

The two lead suspects in the murders were Ronald Harvey and Samuel Christian of the Black Mafia. Harvey was a Philadelphia crime figure that was the 320th person placed on the FBI Ten Most Wanted Fugitives list for his suspected involvement in the Coxson murder.  He was arrested and indicted on 11 counts regarding the Coxson murder with bail set at $3 million. He was eventually convicted of the 1973 Hanafi Muslim massacre of two women and five children in Washington D.C. in January 1973. Harvey was never charged with the Coxson murder and died in prison.

Christian was the 321st person placed on the FBI Ten Most Wanted Fugitives list for his suspected involvement with the Coxson murder.  Christian was not convicted of the Coxson murder since no witnesses were willing to come forward.

Coxson was interred at Mount Lawn Cemetery in Darby, Pennsylvania.

See also
List of unsolved murders

Footnotes

References

External links
Allah Behind Bars, Brendan McGarvey, CityPaper, November 7–13, 2002
The Nation: The Pedaling Pol, Time Magazine, Monday, May. 29, 1972

1920s births
1973 deaths
20th-century African-American people
1973 murders in the United States
20th-century American businesspeople
African-American gangsters
American gangsters
American drug traffickers
Black Mafia
Burials in Pennsylvania
Businesspeople from Philadelphia
Deaths by firearm in New Jersey
Gangsters from Philadelphia
Male murder victims
Murdered African-American people
Murdered American gangsters
Nightclub owners
People from Cherry Hill, New Jersey
People from Fayette County, Pennsylvania
People murdered by African-American organized crime
People murdered in New Jersey
Unsolved murders in the United States
Year of birth uncertain